UVision Air Ltd. is an Israeli defense technology company established in 2011. It engaged in the development, manufacturing and sales of advance missiles and loitering munition systems for land, air, and naval military forces. The company’s products, called HERO, are designed for targeted attacks against a variety of threats at various ranges.

The company established the UVision USA Corporation in the United States, and AVision Systems Private Ltd. in India.

Loitering munition systems
UVision develops the HERO family of loitering systems. The HERO is a sensor-to-shooter system used for surveillance, target acquisition and attack of a variety of targets  in the battlefield. The family of loitering systems supports several launch methods: from the ground by a single soldier, from a vehicle, and from a variety of aerial and naval platforms. The HERO flies to the target area, loiters above the point of interest, tracks, and attacks the target. It is operated remotely and controlled in real time by a communications system. The HERO is equipped with an electro-optical camera whose images are received by the command and control station.

HERO product line

 HERO-20 - manpack, portable short-range tactical loitering system.
 HERO-30 - manpack, portable short-range loitering munitions.
 HERO-70 - short-range loitering system used primarily for lightweight vehicle targets.
 HERO-120 - mid-range loitering system for personnel targets, lightweight vehicles, and antitank missions.
 HERO-250 - long-range loitering munition system.
 HERO-400 - long-range loitering munition system for strategic targets and for missions where heavy ammunition is involved.
 HERO-900 - long-range & highly lethal loitering system for strategic missions.
 HERO-1250 - long-range & highly lethal loitering munition system for long-range strategic missions.
 HERO-R - man-portable rotary-wing loitering munition intended for use in close-combat situations.

References

External links

 

Defense companies of Israel
Companies established in 2011
2011 establishments in Israel